Richard M. Friedberg (born October 8, 1935), is a theoretical physicist who has contributed to a wide variety of problems in mathematics and physics. These include mathematical logic, number theory, solid state physics, general relativity, particle physics, quantum optics, genome research, and the foundations of quantum physics.

Early life 
Friedberg was born in Manhattan on Oct 8, 1935, the child of cardiologist Charles K. Friedberg, and playwright Gertrude Tonkonogy.

Academic work 
Friedberg's most well-known work dates back to the mid-1950s. As an undergraduate at Harvard, he published several papers over a period of 2–3 years. The first paper introduced the priority method, a common technique in computability theory, in order to prove the existence of recursively enumerable sets with incomparable degrees of unsolvability.

In 1968, Friedberg proved independently what became known as Bell’s inequality, not knowing that J. S. Bell had proved it a few years earlier. He showed it to the physicist and historian Max Jammer,  who somehow managed to insert it into his book “The Conceptual Development of Quantum Mechanics”, although the latter bears the publication date 1966. This caused Friedberg some embarrassment later when classmates at Harvard, knowing of the result only through Jammer’s book, supposed that Friedberg was the first discoverer.
(A letter from Friedberg to Jammer dated May 1971 begins, “It was nice of you to remember what I showed you in 1968. I finally got around to writing it up in 1969, but just then I found out about Bell’s 1964 paper (Physics 1, 195) which had anticipated my ‘discovery’ by three years. So I did not publish.”) More recently, Friedberg worked on the foundations of quantum mechanics in collaboration with the late Pierre Hohenberg.

Friedberg is also known for his love of music and poetry. He wrote poems in several letters

 to cognitive scientist and writer Douglas Hofstadter in 1989. The last letter contains two sonnets ”The Electromagnetic Spectrum” and "Fermions and Bosons". These letters also include critiques and analyses of topics in Metamagical Themas, a collection of articles that Hofstadter wrote for Scientific American during the early 1980s.

Friedberg wrote an informal book on number theory titled "An Adventurer's Guide to Number Theory". In the book, he states, "The difference between the theory of numbers and arithmetic is like the difference between poetry and grammar."

Selected publications

 "Two Recursively Enumerable Sets Not Recursive in Each Other", Richard Friedberg, Proc. Natl. Acad. Sci. vol. 43, p. 236 (1957) [communicated by K. Gödel]. 
 "A criterion for completeness of degrees of unsolvability", Richard. M. Friedberg, Journal of Symbolic Logic, Volume 22, Issue 2 June 1957, pp. 159–160.
 "A Learning Machine: Part I", R.M. Friedberg, IBM Journal of Research and Development (Volume: 2, Issue: 1, Jan. 1958).
 "Three theorems on recursive enumeration. I. Decomposition. II. Maximal set. III. Enumeration without duplication", Richard M. Friedberg, Journal of Symbolic Logic, Volume 23, Issue 3 September 1958, pp. 309–316.
 "Dual Trees and Resummation Theorems", R. Friedberg, J. Math. Phys. vol. 16, p 20 (1974). 
 "The Electrostatics and Magnetostatics of a Conducting Disc", R. Friedberg, Am. J. Phys vol. 61, p. 1084 (1993).
 "Path Integrals in Polar Variables with Spontaneously Broken Symmetry", R. Friedberg, J. Math Phys. vol. 36, p. 2675 (1995). 
 "Derivation of Regge’s Action from Einstein’s Theory of General Relativity", R. Friedberg and T. D. Lee, Nucl. Phys. B 242, 145 (1984).
 "Frequency Shifts in Emission and Absorption by Resonant Systems of Two-Level Atoms", (with S. R. Hartmann and J. T. Manassah), Phys. Reports 7C, 101 (1973).
 "Efficient Sorting of Genomic Permutation by Translocation, inversion and block interchange" S. Yancopoulos, O. Attie, Friedberg, Bioinformatics vol. 21, pp 3352–59 (2005).

References

See also
Friedberg–Muchnik theorem

1935 births
21st-century American physicists
Theoretical physicists
Living people
Harvard University alumni